Almirall, S.A. is a Spanish pharmaceutical company, with headquarters in Barcelona, founded in 1943.

In 2016, it generated total revenue of €859.3 million and became the leading pharmaceutical company in R&D investment in Spain.

With over 1,975 employees (2016), it has a presence, through its 13 affiliates in Europe and United States.

History

Early history
Almirall SA was founded in 1943 in Spain. In 1979 the company launched gastroprokinetic clebopride in Spain, the first product from the company’s internal R&D team. In 1984 the business launched antacid product, almagate, in Spain, as well as anti-inflammatory piketoprofen in 1985 and antihistamine ebastine and cinitapride in 1985. In the same year, Almirall opened its first subsidiary, based in Belgium. In 1992 the company launched aceclofenac and a year later opened its second foreign subsidiary, in Portugal. The company's new headquarters were opened in Barcelona, in 1994. In 1997 Almirall and Prodesfarma merged their interests.

Further expansion
In 2000 the FDA approved anti-migraine agent almotriptan. A year later the company opened its Mexican subsidiary as well as acquiring its French affiliate. Beginning in 2002, Almirall opened a series of European based subsidiaries; Italy (2002), Germany (2003), Austria, Poland, the United Kingdom, Ireland and Switzerland (2008) and Nordic Countries (2010).

In 2005 the business acquired the commercial rights for Sativex in Europe for the treatment of spasticity associated to multiple sclerosis. In 2006, the company opened its new R&D Centre based in Sant Feliu de Llobregat as well as the acquisition of the Centre of Excellence for Inhalation Technology.

In 2007 the company floated on the Spanish stock market, as well as acquiring European dermatology specialist, Hermal. The company also acquired a portfolio of eight products from Shire plc.

In 2011 Almirall launched Actikerall prescribed for the local treatment of actinic keratosis.

In 2012 Almirall opened its first North America subsidiary, based in Canada and launched aclidinium, prescribed for chronic obstructive pulmonary disease (COPD), in Europe under the brand Eklira Genuair and Bretaris Genuair and in the United States under the brand Tudorza Pressair. The business also launched Monovo, for the treatment of inflammatory skin diseases such as psoriasis.

In 2013 Almirall acquired another specialist dermatology company, Aqua Pharmaceuticals. The company launched linaclotide in Europe (Constella) for irritable bowel syndrome with constipation (IBS-C) and opened its Netherlands subsidiary.

In 2014 Almirall divested its rights to its respiratory franchise to Astrazeneca focussing on the dermatology, later in 2015 declaring its strategic intention to become a leading pharmaceutical company in the field of dermatology and continuing with its expansion by acquiring Poli Group Holding.

In 2016 Almirall acquired ThermiGen LLC.

In January 2020, the company announced it would acquire Bioniz Therapeutic. In 2020, Almirall earned 74.3 million euros, 30% less than the previous year. The following year it closed with a loss of 40.9 million. According to the annual accounts, the losses were justified by the accounting impairment of various products, although sales grew by 2.5%, driven by the dermatology business. In February 2022 it was announced that Carlos Gallardo would replace his father, Jorge Gallardo, as president of the company.

Activities 
Almirall collaborates with various public and private entities, such as the Centro Superior de Investigaciones Científicas (CSIC), the Instituto de Investigación Biomédica and the Parc Científic de Barcelona in Spain. Highlighted among the international alliances are those with the Imperial College London (United Kingdom) and the National Institute of Health (NIH) in the United States. Almirall participated in the creation of the Barcelona Respiratory Network Foundation. In Europe, the company has contributed in several projects with the Innovative Medicines Initiative (IMI).

Centres 
The company has three R&D centres distributed in Spain and Germany (Reinbek) and Switzerland (Lugano).
The R&D centre in Sant Feliu de Llobregat (Barcelona), houses the departments involved in all stages of R&D, as well as the development of new chemical entities. The Reinbek Centre of Excellence for Dermatology specializes in the development of new formulas for the treatment of skin diseases.

The company also has three production centres: two in Spain, the pharmaceutical plant in Sant Andreu de la Barca (Barcelona) and the pharmaceutical and chemical plant in Sant Celoni (Barcelona); and a pharmaceutical plant in  Germany (Reinbek); as well as 13 affiliates in Germany, Austria, Belgium-Luxembourg, the United States, France, the Netherlands, Italy, the Nordic countries, Poland, Portugal, the United Kingdom-Ireland, Spain and Switzerland.

Numbers

Main products

References

External links 
 

Biotechnology companies of Spain
Pharmaceutical companies of Spain
Manufacturing companies based in Barcelona
Companies listed on the Madrid Stock Exchange
Pharmaceutical companies established in 1943
1943 establishments in Spain
Spanish brands
Multinational companies headquartered in Spain